Leigh Allen Rekow (born June 26, 1934) is an American politician in the state of Iowa.

Rekow was born in the Luana/Postville, Iowa area and is a farmer. As a Republican, he served in the Iowa House of Representatives from 2001 to 2003 (32nd district).

References

1934 births
Living people
People from Clayton County, Iowa
Farmers from Iowa
Republican Party members of the Iowa House of Representatives